= William Henry Broome =

New Zealand clothier and tailor

- Born: 30 September 1873; Leek, Staffordshire, England
- Died: 8 June 1943 (aged 69)
- Occupations: Clothier, tailor
- Known for: Tailoring and clothing trade in New Zealand

William Henry Broome (30 September 1873–8 June 1943) was a New Zealand clothier and tailor. He was born in Leek, Staffordshire, England on 30 September 1873.
